Gordon Aitchison (June 14, 1909 – January 6, 1990) was a Canadian basketball player who competed in the 1936 Summer Olympics. He died at 80 in 1990.

Born in North Bay, he was part of the Canadian basketball team, which won the silver medal. He played all six matches including the final.

References

External links
profile

1909 births
1990 deaths
Basketball people from Ontario
Basketball players at the 1936 Summer Olympics
Basketball position missing
Canadian men's basketball players
Olympic basketball players of Canada
Olympic medalists in basketball
Olympic silver medalists for Canada
Sportspeople from North Bay, Ontario
Medalists at the 1936 Summer Olympics